View from the Vault, Volume Three (or View from the Vault III) is the third release in the "View from the Vault" series by the Grateful Dead. It was released simultaneously as a three disc album on CD and as a concert performance video on DVD. It contains the June 16, 1990 show at the Shoreline Amphitheatre in Mountain View, California.

The album also includes six songs from a show at the same venue on October 3, 1987.  One of these is "My Brother Esau", the first appearance of this song on an album in CD format.  The studio version had been the B-side of the "Touch of Grey" single in 1987, appeared on the cassette version of the In the Dark album, and was later released on the Beyond Description box set (it was then appended to the 2004 reissue of In the Dark). Another track from October 3, 1987 ("Maggie's Farm") had been released earlier in the year on Postcards of the Hanging.

Track listing

Disc one
June 16, 1990 – first set:
"Let the Good Times Roll" > (Sam Cooke) – 4:52
"Truckin'" > (Robert Hunter, Jerry Garcia, Phil Lesh, Bob Weir) – 10:06
"Touch of Grey" (Hunter, Garcia) – 7:30
"Mama Tried" > (Merle Haggard) – 2:35
"Big River" (Johnny Cash) – 5:52
"Friend of the Devil" (John Dawson, Hunter, Garcia) – 8:06
"Cassidy" (John Barlow, Weir) – 6:21
"Big Boss Man" (Luther Dixon, Al Smith) – 7:24
"One More Saturday Night" (Weir) – 5:23

Disc two
June 16, 1990 – second set:
"China Cat Sunflower" > (Hunter, Garcia) – 10:39
"I Know You Rider" (trad., arr. Grateful Dead) – 5:44
"We Can Run" (Barlow, Brent Mydland) – 5:50
"Estimated Prophet" > (Barlow, Weir) – 13:07
"Terrapin Station" > (Hunter, Garcia) – 15:20
"Jam" > (Grateful Dead) – 15:16
"Space" > (Grateful Dead) - 11:49

Disc three
June 16, 1990 – second set, continued:
"Drums" > (Mickey Hart, Bill Kreutzmann) – 4:12
"China Doll" > (Hunter, Garcia) – 6:45
"Sugar Magnolia" (Hunter, Weir) – 9:57
June 16, 1990 – encore:
"It's All Over Now, Baby Blue" (Bob Dylan) – 7:37
Bonus tracks from October 3, 1987:
"Hey Pocky Way" (Joseph Modeliste, Arthur Neville, Leo Nocentelli, George Porter) – 6:17
"New Minglewood Blues" (Noah Lewis) – 7:36
"Candyman" (Hunter, Garcia) – 7:51
"When I Paint My Masterpiece" (Dylan) – 4:39 
"West L.A. Fadeaway" (Hunter, Garcia) – 7:34
"My Brother Esau" (Barlow, Weir) – 4:26

Notes

Personnel

Grateful Dead
Jerry Garcia – lead guitar, vocals
Bob Weir – rhythm guitar, vocals
Phil Lesh – bass guitar, vocals
Brent Mydland – Hammond organ, keyboards, vocals
Mickey Hart – drums, percussion
Bill Kreutzmann – drums, percussion

Production
Len Dell'Amico - director, co-producer
Dan Healy– recording
Jeffrey Norman – mastering
David Lemieux – tape archivist
Cassidy Law – album coordination
Eileen Law – archival research
Robert Minkin – package design
Ken Friedman – photography

See also
 View from the Vault, Volume One
 View from the Vault, Volume Two
 View from the Vault, Volume Four

References

03
2002 live albums
2002 video albums
Live video albums